Melinda Jane MacLean (née McLellan; January 19, 1946) is a Canadian former politician. She represented the electoral district of Colchester in the Nova Scotia House of Assembly from 1974 to 1978. She was a member of the Nova Scotia Liberal Party.

MacLean was born in Truro, Nova Scotia, the daughter of former Colchester MLA Robert F. McLellan. She attended the University of New Brunswick and Dalhousie University, earning a Bachelor of Laws degree from the latter. In 1968, she married John Alton MacLean.

References

1946 births
Living people
Dalhousie University alumni
Nova Scotia Liberal Party MLAs
People from Truro, Nova Scotia
Women MLAs in Nova Scotia